Elias Ymer (born 10 April 1996) is a Swedish tennis player. He has a career high ATP singles ranking of World No. 105, achieved on 11 June 2018. He has a career high ATP doubles ranking of World No. 188, achieved on 16 October 2017.

Personal info
Ymer was born in Skara, Sweden to Ethiopian immigrant parents. His mother, Kelem, is a physician; his father, Wondwosen, works at a dairy company. He is the elder brother of fellow tennis player Mikael Ymer.

From 2017 to 2018, Ymer was coached by Robin Söderling.

In the autumn of 2022 Ymer, together with ten other athletes was accepted as a student at Harvard Business School's “Crossover into Business” program.

Career

2014: ATP debut
Ymer made his ATP main draw singles debut at the 2013 Swedish Open where he lost in the first round to Grigor Dimitrov. Ymer received a wildcard at the 2014 Swedish Open defeating Mikhail Kukushkin in the first round before falling to João Sousa in the second round.

2015: Qualification at all Grand Slams on debut in one year

He qualified to the main of 2015 Australian Open after wins against Benoît Paire, Jan Mertl and Hyeon Chung. He lost in the first round against Go Soeda in five sets.

At the 2015 Barcelona Open Banc Sabadell, Ymer defeated Thiemo de Bakker and Nick Kyrgios to reach the third round, where he lost to David Ferrer.

He qualified to the main draw of 2015 French Open after wins against Roberto Marcora, Blaž Rola and Roberto Carballés Baena. He lost in the first round against Lukáš Rosol in straight sets.

Ymer won his first ATP Challenger title at the 2015 Città di Caltanissetta, beating American Bjorn Fratangelo in straight sets.

Ymer qualified to the main draw of 2015 Wimbledon Championships after wins against Thomas Fabbiano, Boy Westerhof and Guido Pella. He lost in the first round to 23rd seed Ivo Karlović in four sets.

Ymer qualified for all four Grand Slams in 2015 after coming through qualifying at the 2015 US Open. He lost in the first round to Diego Schwartzman. His finish made him the second man to progress to the main draw of all four majors through qualifying in one year, after Frank Dancevic in 2011.

2018: First Grand Slam match win
Ymer secured a place in the main draw for the 2018 French Open winning three qualifying matches. There he won his first grand slam main draw match, beating Dudi Sela in straight sets.

2022: First ATP semifinal and top-20 win
In 2022, he defeated top seed and World No. 15 Aslan Karatsev in straight sets in second round of 2022 Maharashtra Open for his first top-20 win in his career to reach the quarterfinal, only his second since Gstaad in 2016. He went one step further reaching his maiden semifinal by defeating eight seed Stefano Travaglia. As a result he moved up 20 spots in the rankings back into the top 140 on 7 February 2022.

2023
ranked No. 170 at the 2023 Abierto Mexicano Telcel he reached the main draw as a lucky loser after the withdrawal of Cameron Norrie and defeated Adrian Mannarino to reach the second round. As a result he moved 20 positions up back to the top 150.

ATP career finals

Doubles: 1 (1 title)

ATP Challengers and ITF Futures finals

Singles: 15 (11–4)

Doubles: 1 (0–1)

Performance timelines

Singles 
Current through the 2022 Miami Open.

Doubles

References

External links

 
 
 
 

1996 births
Living people
Swedish male tennis players
People from Skara Municipality
Swedish people of Ethiopian descent
Swedish sportspeople of African descent
Sportspeople of Ethiopian descent
Sportspeople from Västra Götaland County